Orkdalen or Orkladalen is a valley and a traditional Norwegian district in Trøndelag county, Norway. In the early Viking Age, before King Harald Fairhair, the Orkla Valley was also a petty kingdom.

The valley begins in the high Dovrefjell mountains and creates a deep, narrow valley. As the river progresses, the valley widens and flattens out. From Rennebu northwards, the valley is fairly heavily populated with good farmland. At the mouth of the river (the north end of the valley) is the town of Orkanger, the largest population centre in the valley.

The district encompasses all the municipalities that surround the Orkla River in the valley. The district includes the municipalities of Rennebu and Orkland. The municipalities of Oppdal and Skaun are often traditionally counted as a parts of the district also even though they lie outside the actual valley of the river Orkla. The river itself actually begins in Oppdal and then winds its way north to the Trondheimsfjord.

References

Districts of Trøndelag
Orkland
Rennebu
Skaun
Oppdal
Petty kingdoms of Norway
Valleys of Trøndelag